Doidae is a family of Lepidoptera first described by Julian P. Donahue and John W. Brown in 1987. Species in Doidae had previously been placed in the Arctiidae, Lymantriidae and the Dioptidae.

The family includes about six species, which are found in the south-western United States, Mexico and neighbouring areas.

Genera
 Doa Neumoegen & Dyar, 1894
 Leuculodes Dyar, 1903

References

External links

 
Moth families